Trefelin Boys & Girls Club, often shortened to Trefelin BGC, is an association football club who play their home games at Ynys park in Port Talbot, Neath Port Talbot, Wales. Their men's team play in the Cymru South.

Trefelin BGC was founded in 1984. Initially they played their matches in the local park (the plough) however they later moved to their current home of Ynys Park near Port Talbot following local fundraising efforts. In 2000, Trefelin BGC won the FAW Trophy by winning in the final 6–2 against Bryntirion Athletic F.C. In 2007 they were promoted as champions of the South Wales Amateur League Second Division and following their first season in the First Division, Trefelin BGC finished the season as runners-up to eventual champions and former Welsh League team AFC Porth. In 2014, Trefelin BGC won promotion from the South Wales Amateur League First Division with at least a fourteen-game unbeaten run. In the same year, they won the W John Owen Cup by defeating AFC Bargoed. In the 2015–16 season, Trefelin won promotion to the Welsh Football League after winning the newly formed South Wales Alliance League.

On 2 January 2019 the club announced the signing of former Swansea City striker Lee Trundle.

The club were champions of the Welsh Football League Division One at the end of the 2019–20 season, remaining unbeaten in the league during a season curtailed by the COVID-19 pandemic.  They were promoted to the second tier of the Welsh football pyramid in June 2020, joining the Cymru South for the 2020–21 season.

Women 
In 2010, Trefelin BGC Ladies were promoted from the Southern Conference into the Welsh Premier Women's Football League. Following two years in Welsh women's top flight, the team broke away from Trefelin BGC and renamed themselves Port Talbot Town Ladies after becoming affiliated with Port Talbot Town F.C.

References 

Football clubs in Wales
Association football clubs established in 1984
1984 establishments in Wales
Sport in Port Talbot
Women's football clubs in Wales
Welsh Football League clubs
South Wales Alliance League clubs
South Wales Amateur League clubs
Cymru South clubs